Zeuxis may refer to:
 Zeuxis (general), Greek general
 Zeuxis (painter), Greek painter
 Zeuxis of Tarentum, Greek physician
 Zeuxis (wrestler) (born 1988), Puerto Rican professional wrestler
 Zeuxis (gastropod), a genus of sea snails in the family Nassariidae